McCaulley may refer to:

Mariana McCaulley (1890–1946), American epigrapher and Latin teacher
McCaulley, Texas, an unincorporated community in Fisher County, Texas, United States

See also
McCauley (disambiguation)